Jackson Matthew Thompson (born July 2, 1992) is an American soccer player.

Career

Youth, college and amateur
Thompson was part of the Columbus Crew Soccer Academy for three years before spending his entire college career at Messiah College.  He made a total of 89 appearances for the Falcons and tallied 35 goals and 50 assists. He holds the career assist record at Messiah, and his 17 assists in 2013 are second for single-season assists. While at Messiah, Thompson also played in the Premier Development League for Southern West Virginia King's Warriors.

Professional
On March 20, 2015, Thompson signed a professional contract with USL expansion side Charlotte Independence.  On March 27, he made his professional debut for the club in their season opener against the Charleston Battery and scored the first goal in club history.  Unfortunately, the match ended in a 3–2 defeat. He was given the nickname 'Rat' by his teammates for his scamper-like run.

References

External links
Messiah Falcons bio
USSF Development Academy bio

1992 births
Living people
American soccer players
Southern West Virginia King's Warriors players
Charlotte Independence players
Pittsburgh Riverhounds SC players
Association football midfielders
Soccer players from Akron, Ohio
USL League Two players
USL Championship players
Messiah Falcons men's soccer players
People from Hudson, Ohio